The Challenger del Biobío is a professional tennis tournament played on clay courts. It is currently part of the Association of Tennis Professionals (ATP) Challenger Tour. It is held in Concepción, Chile. It is promoted by the regional government with a provision of $30 mln to make it a long-running tournament, the second edition being already planned.
The 2022 edition will be played with no restriction due to  covid-19 pandemic, that is with attending people.

Past finals

Singles

Doubles

References

External links
Official website
ATP Challenger website

ATP Challenger Tour
Clay court tennis tournaments
Tennis tournaments in Chile
Recurring sporting events established in 2022